Monterey Park is a census-designated place in Valencia County, New Mexico, United States. Its population was 1,567 as of the 2010 census. It is part of the Albuquerque Metropolitan Statistical Area.

The U.S. Census Bureau previously considered Monterey Park and the neighboring community of El Cerro Mission to be a single CDP, El Cerro-Monterey Park. The CDP was split prior to the 2010 Census.

Demographics

Education
It is in the Los Lunas Public Schools school district.

References

Census-designated places in New Mexico
Census-designated places in Valencia County, New Mexico